Harlyn Odell Halvorson (May 17, 1925 – June 17, 2008) was an American microbiologist who served as director of the Marine Biological Laboratory from 1987 to 1992. Previously, he was director of the Rosenstiel Basic Medical Sciences Research Center at Brandeis University from 1971 to 1987, and served as president of the American Society for Microbiology in 1977. He was elected a member of the National Academy of Medicine in 1989.

References

1925 births
2008 deaths
American microbiologists
Scientists from Minneapolis
University of Minnesota alumni
University of Illinois alumni
Brandeis University faculty
University of Wisconsin–Madison faculty
Respiratory disease deaths in Massachusetts
Members of the National Academy of Medicine